Channel Live is an American hip hop duo composed of Vincent "Tuffy" Morgan and Hakim Green, which recorded for Capitol Records and Flavor Unit Records.

Discovered by KRS-One, the duo released its debut album, Station Identification, in 1995. It spawned the group's biggest hit, "Mad Izm", which peaked at 54 on the Billboard Hot 100. After the album ran its course, the group continued to make appearances throughout the 1990s, including on KRS-One's self-titled album and on the soundtrack of the first Wesley Snipes Blade film. In 2000, the group released a second album titled Armaghetto on Flavor Unit – it featured Method Man, the now-late Black Rob, Ms. Toi, Malik Yusef, and the singer Carl Thomas. A third album, Secret Science Rap, followed in 2006.

Hakim Green of Channel Live has stayed active into 2021 and 2022, collaborating with Treach, Dres, Keith Murray, Thirstin Howl III, Sadat X, General Steele, and DoItAll Dupré, as well as with Carl Thomas and KRS-One. He and KRS-One remain frequent collaborators. Hakim Green is a believer in 9/11 conspiracy theories.

Discography

References

American musical duos
Capitol Records artists
East Coast hip hop groups
Hip hop duos
Musical groups from New Jersey